The Men's 100m T54 had its First Round held on September 15 at 12:11 and its Final on September 16 at 17:50.

Medalists

Results

Footnotes

Round 1 - Heat 1
Round 1 - Heat 2
Round 1 - Heat 3
Final

Athletics at the 2008 Summer Paralympics